Ultimate is a greatest hits album by Taiwanese singer Jolin Tsai. It was released on August 28, 2012, by Sony. It includes 30 songs and 10 music videos previously released by Universal and Sony.

Background and release 
On July 23, 2002, Tsai signed a recording contract with Sony, through which she later released three studio albums—Magic (2003), Castle (2004), and J-Game (2005), and the they have sold more than 1.5 million, 1.5 million, and 1.2 million copies in Asia, respectively. In Taiwan, they have sold more than 360,000, 300,000, and 260,000 copies, respectively, and each of them became the highest-selling album by a female artist and the second highest-selling album overall in their respective years of release. On February 16, 2006, Tsai signed a recording contract with EMI. On May 5, 2006, Sony BMG released for Tsai the greatest hits album, J-Top. On November 3, 2006, Sony BMG released for Tsai the compilation album, Favorite. On September 19, 2007, Sony BMG released for Tsai the greatest hits album, Final Wonderland.

On August 28, 2012, Sony released for Tsai a greatest hits album, and it includes her 25 songs previously, nine music videos, and one live medley video from J1 Live Concert released by Sony and five songs previously released by Universal. On September 14, 2012, it reached number 14 on the weekly record chart of Five Music in Taiwan.

Track listing

Release history

References

External links 
 

2012 greatest hits albums
Jolin Tsai compilation albums
Sony Music Taiwan compilation albums